Les Chevaliers de la Table ronde may refer to:

Les Chevaliers de la Table ronde, literary circle including Jean Fontaine
Les Chevaliers de la Table ronde (Hervé), 1866 operetta
Les Chevaliers de la Table ronde (Cocteau), 1937 play
Les Chevaliers de la Table ronde (film), 1990 French film with Alain Cuny as Merlin
Les Chevaliers de la Table ronde (game), French game